Alejandro Edda (born May 17, 1984) is a Mexican–American actor, best known for his roles as Marco Rodriguez in the AMC television series Fear the Walking Dead (2016) and Joaquín "El Chapo" Guzmán in the Netflix original series Narcos: Mexico (2018–2021). His voice roles in video games include Gustavo in Uncharted 4: A Thief's End, Agent Ricardo "Ricky" Sandoval in Ghost Recon: Wildlands (2017) and Manny in The Last of Us Part II (2020).

He has also appeared in roles for Hollywood films, including Pancho the Cop in the romantic comedy Sundown (2016), Big Jim in Reality High (2017) and Jorge Luis Ochoa Vásquez in American Made (2017).

Edda also appeared in the action horror film The Forever Purge, which was theatrically released in July 2021.

Early life
Edda was born in Puebla, Mexico in 1984. After high school, he studied arts at the Russian Conservatory of Mexico City. At the end of his senior year, he went to join his mother in San Francisco, United States, to pursue an acting career.

He then moved to Los Angeles and studied at the Meisner Acting Studio.

Career
Prior to his acting career, Edda used to be a wine delivery person, but he was fired before being fired from his job as a valet parker as well. Edda started his acting career by appearing in commercials for Domino's Pizza.

After a series of short films, Edda joined the cast of the television series The Bridge in 2013, for eight episodes. The actor continues his American breakthrough by playing supporting roles in other series such as Fear the Walking Dead and Lethal Weapon.

In 2017, he was part of the cast of the film American Made directed by Doug Liman and distributed by Universal Pictures. In this thriller, he plays the role of Jorge Ochoa, a drug trafficker who is the founding member of the Medellín Cartel. This film marks its first box office success.

Edda also appeared as the voice and motion capture of Gustavo in the 2016 PlayStation 4 video game Uncharted 4: A Thief's End, with fellow voice actors Nolan North and Brandon Scott.

In 2018, he appeared in the biopic Cocaine Godmother on the drug lord Griselda Blanco. The same year, he appears as Joaquín "El Chapo" Guzmán, leader of the Sinaloa Cartel in the Netflix original series Narcos: Mexico, featuring actors such as Diego Luna and Michael Peña. His character has appeared in the show's third and final season, which has proved to be the show's finale that aired on November 5, 2021, with Bad Bunny joining the show's cast.

He then provided the voice and motion-capture of Manny in the PlayStation 4 video game The Last of Us Part II. Naughty Dog's casting director, Becky Todd, contacted Edda while he was spending Christmas with his grandmother in Mexico, informing him that Neil Druckmann wanted to speak with him; the two spoke on the phone, and Druckmann offered him the role of Manny. Edda, who has little other experience with video games, accepted as he found it to be a unique and creative experience. During production, Druckmann allowed Edda to be creative with his performance, adding small details to the character as he deemed appropriate; for example, Edda felt that Manny would drink mezcal instead of whiskey, as had been suggested in the script, and the line was changed. Manny's design was based on Edda's physical appearance, which added more time to his work on the game; he worked on it for about two years.

He appeared in the role of Trinidad "T.T." Toledo, a Mexican farmhand, in the 2021 action horror film, and the fifth film of The Purge franchise, The Forever Purge, directed by Everardo Gout and starring Ana de la Reguera, Tenoch Huerta (with whom he co-starred in Narcos: Mexico), Josh Lucas, Cassidy Freeman and Will Patton.

Personal life
On July 17, 2009, Edda was married to Aura Serna and currently resides in Los Angeles. He has two sons Luciano Edda (b. March 2009) and Paolo Edda (b. February 2014). He later became a naturalized American citizen.

Trial of Joaquín "El Chapo" Guzmán

On January 28, 2019, Edda was a witness who was present at the trial of the real Joaquín "El Chapo" Guzmán when he seized the opportunity to see the real crime lord himself be charged on multiple counts of drug trafficking. The actor's appearance among the witnesses in the eleventh week of the trial happened in Brooklyn Federal Court.

According to a CNN news report, Edda states that "it was a rare opportunity". He also says that "what else could be better than to see the man in real life, learn his mannerisms".

Filmography

Film

Television

Video games

References

External links

1984 births
American male film actors
American male television actors
American male voice actors
21st-century American male actors
21st-century Mexican male actors
People from Los Angeles
Mexican emigrants to the United States
Mexican male film actors
Mexican male television actors
Mexican male voice actors
Male actors from Puebla
Living people
Naturalized citizens of the United States